Ramer may refer to:

 Places in the United States
Ramer, Alabama, an unincorporated community in Montgomery County, Alabama 
Ramer, Tennessee, a city in McNairy County, Tennessee
Ramer Field, a stadium in River Falls, Wisconsin

 People
 George H. Ramer (1927–1951), United States Marine Corps officer
 Jon Ramer (born 1958), American entrepreneur, civic leader, inventor, and musician
 Rodica Ramer physicist / engineer, working in the field of microelectronics technologies